McKissic is a surname. Notable people with the surname include:

Dwight McKissic (born 1958), American Southern Baptist minister
J. D. McKissic (born 1993), American football player
Shaquielle McKissic (born 1990), American-Azerbaijani basketball player
William Dwight McKissic, Sr. (b. 1958), Southern Baptist minister in Arlington, Texas

See also
 McKissack (disambiguation)
 McKissick (disambiguation)
 MacKessack (disambiguation)